Lalah may refer to:
 Lalah Hathaway, American singer
 Lalah (Puerto Rican singer)